Beji is an administrative district in Depok, West Java, Indonesia, within the Jakarta metropolitan area. It covers an area of 14.56 km2 and had a population of 165,903 at the 2010 Census; the latest official estimate (as at mid 2018) is 222,372. The University of Indonesia, Gunadarma University and Bina Sarana Informatika are located in this area.

Administrative villages (Kelurahan)
There are six administrative villages within Beji.
Beji
Beji Timur
Kemiri Muka
Pondok Cina
Kukusan
Tanah Baru

Facilities and infrastructure
There are many educational institutions located in this area including  University of Indonesia, Gunadarma University and Bina Sarana Informatika. The area has hospitals, and many places of worships. At Tanah Baru Village, there are housing area such as Arroyyan Tanah Baru, Beji Permai, Depok Mulya III, and Griya Sakinah. In the New Land there is also an Integrated Islamic Primary School and SDIT Taman Ilmu. Sweet Bee Playground and Arroyyan Kindergarten are located in the Arroyyan Tanah Baru Housing.
Margo City, Depok Town Square shopping malls are located in this area.

Transportation
Pondok Cina and UI station of Jakarta Metro-rail is located in this area. Beji is connected by Cinere–Jagorawi Toll Road.

References

depok
Populated places in West Java